Capture the Sun is a collaborative studio album by American rapper Illogic and American hip hop producer Blockhead. It was released on Man Bites Dog Records on April 16, 2013.

The title derives from a quote Illogic's grandmother told him, "that all things delayed are not denied, which basically means anything you run into might not always happen when you want it to but if you continue to work for it good things will follow."

Critical reception

Chaz Kangas of Spectrum Culture wrote, "Blockhead's production is layered, textured and tailor made for Illogic's mood, and Illogic knows how to accentuate the environment Blockhead's planted him in by weaving his flow through his rhyme choices like a lantern through the deep woods."

HipHopDX included it on the "Top 25 Albums of 2013" list.

Track listing

References

External links
 

2013 albums
Collaborative albums
Illogic albums
Blockhead (music producer) albums